Lucy and J. Vassie Wilson House is a historic home located at High Point, Guilford County, North Carolina. It was built in 1926, and is a two-story, three bay, Colonial Revival style brick dwelling. It has a tile hipped roof, porte-cochère, and features a semicircular columned porch supported by four columns with stylized Corinthian order capitals. Also on the property is a contributing three-car brick garage.

It was listed on the National Register of Historic Places in 2005.  It is located in the Uptown Suburbs Historic District.

References

Buildings and structures in High Point, North Carolina
Houses on the National Register of Historic Places in North Carolina
Colonial Revival architecture in North Carolina
Houses completed in 1926
Houses in Guilford County, North Carolina
National Register of Historic Places in Guilford County, North Carolina
Historic district contributing properties in North Carolina